Cuenco is a surname. Notable people with the surname include:

 Cuenco family
 Antonio Cuenco (born 1936), Filipino politician
 Ernani Cuenco (1936–1988), Filipino composer
 José María Cuenco (1885–1972), Filipino Archbishop
 Mariano Jesús Cuenco (1888–1964), Filipino politician and writer
 Monica Cuenco (born 1994), Filipino singers
 Rey Cuenco (1960–1996), Filipino basketball player